Mondy (Moondo) is a rural locality (a settlement) in Tunkinsky District, Republic of Buryatia, Russia. The population was 1,000 as of 2010. There are 18 streets.

Geography 
Mondy is located 84 km west of Kyren (the district's administrative centre) by road. Turan is the nearest rural locality.

References 

Rural localities in Tunkinsky District